The original soundtrack of The Crow: City of Angels, the sequel to the 1994 film The Crow, was released on July 29, 1996, by Hollywood Records.  The album includes a cover of the Fleetwood Mac song "Gold Dust Woman" by Hole, as well as tracks by other heavyweight artists such as White Zombie, Korn, Deftones and Iggy Pop. Like the original Crow soundtrack, a song by Joy Division (one of O'Barr's favorite bands) is covered, "In a Lonely Place" by Bush.

Initial pressings contained a small Crow comic in the CD booklet, written by John Wagner and illustrated by Dean Ormston.

Hole, Filter, Tricky and Rob Zombie all returned for the soundtrack of The Crow: Salvation.

According to RIAA, the album has been certified Platinum with sales exceeding 1 million copies in the United States. The album was reportedly banned in Korea and Singapore.

Track listing

Certifications

References

1996 soundtrack albums
Hollywood Records soundtracks
Alternative rock soundtracks
Heavy metal soundtracks
Industrial soundtracks
Gothic rock soundtracks
The Crow
Superhero film soundtracks